Char may refer to:

People
Char Fontane, American actress
Char Margolis, American spiritualist
René Char (1907–1988), French poet
The Char family of Colombia:
Fuad Char, Colombian senator
Alejandro Char Chaljub, mayor of Barranquilla 
Arturo Char Chaljub, Colombian senator
David Char Navas, Colombian senator
Sofia Daccarett Char, better known as Sofia Carson, American actress and singer
Char (musician), stage name of Japanese musician Hisato Takenaka (born 1955)

Other uses
River Char, a river in Dorset, England
Char (chemistry), the solid material that forms during the initial stage of combustion of a carbonaceous material
Char (fish), a common name for fishes in the genus Salvelinus, including Arctic char
Char Aznable, a fictional character from the Mobile Suit Gundam series
A char in ANSI/ISO C is a value holding one byte (which was the size of a character in legacy encodings such as ASCII)
A common slang term for tea throughout the British Empire in the 19th and 20th centuries
A charwoman, a cleaning woman
A characteristic (algebra) of a ring in mathematics
Any French tank (from char d'assaut), but more specifically one with a short designation such as:
Char B1, a French heavy tank manufactured before the Second World War
Char 2C, a super-heavy French tank developed during the First World War
Char D1, a pre-World War II French tank
Char D2, a French tank of the Interbellum
Char G1, a French replacement project for the Char D2 medium tank

See also

 Charr (disambiguation)
 Chars, commune in France